Miriamm Wright is an American singer and songwriter.

Early life 
She was born in Pittsburgh, Pennsylvania, United States. She moved to the Washington, D.C. area at age of five years old.

Wright performed in various singing and talent competitions as a child. At age 10, Wright lost her mother to breast cancer.  She entered talent shows during high school and discovered her love of old school music.  She went on to write, produce and star in a play called Sound the Alarm, which was created for the purpose of dispelling myths surrounding breast cancer.

Career

2002–2005: Peaches and Herb 
Wright performed as the fifth "Peaches". She joined in 2002 and began touring with Herb. She was introduced to the world as the new "Peaches" when she joined Herb in the PBS televised "Rhythm, Love & Soul" Fundraising drive. She then appeared in several pledge drives for PBS. They shared the stage with greats such as Aretha Franklin, Gloria Gaynor and Lou Rawls. Their on-stage chemistry was so well received, it sparked another invitation to the duo for the follow-up installment featuring R&B greats such as Irene Cara, Heatwave and Anita Ward. Both performances air periodically.

2007: Kennedy Center
Wright headlined a concert at The Kennedy Center for the Performing Arts in performance in "A Concert of Love: Conquering, Claiming, and Celebrating Your Victory," honoring breast cancer survivors.

2008–2010: Tours 
Wright opened for acts such as India.Arie, Jill Scott and Boyz II Men. Her debut video, "Road of Peace" aired on BET JAZZ and BET Gospel.

2014 – Present : Bethesda Blues  
In 2014, Wright began performing at a benefit concert called "Miriamm turns Bethesda Blues & Jazz Pink" in honor of Breast Cancer Awareness Month with the annual EPW Awards! EPW Awards honors breast cancer survivors, their caregivers, doctors, and members of the community who are working in the fight against breast cancer.

Discography
 2004: Miriamm! Live at Blues Alley 
 2008: Road of Peace  
 2010: My Favorite Things

Filmography
Wright portrayed the late Mahalia Jackson in the stage play Sing Mahalia Sing and appeared in Cadillac Records (Sony Music Films), portraying a background singer for Etta James (Beyoncé Knowles).

Philanthropy
Wright founded and serves as Chair of the Board for the non-profit organization the Edith P. Wright Breast Cancer Foundation, Inc. (EPW), raising money to provide support services to families facing breast cancer, as well as to provide education and screening to under-served communities. Wright has headlined at the John F. Kennedy Center for the Performing Arts, Bethesda Blues and Jazz Supper Club and Blues Alley in concerts designed to raise funding and awareness to the disease of breast cancer. Wright wrote a song for Breast Cancer Awareness entitled, "We Must Find A Cure" with proceeds supporting the fight against breast cancer.

References

1971 births
Living people
Songwriters from Pennsylvania
People from Pittsburgh
21st-century American singers